The Holothyrida are a small order of mites in the superorder Parasitiformes. No fossils are known. With body lengths of more than  they are relatively large mites, with a heavily sclerotized body. It is divided into three families, Allothyridae, Holothyridae, and Neothyridae. In a 1998 experimental study, members of the family Allothyridae were found to ignore living animals but readily fed on the body fluids of dead arthropods.

The order has a distribution largely confined to former Gondwanan landmasses. They are the sister group to Ixodida (ticks).

Systematics

Allothyridae
Allothyridae van der Hammen, 1972 — Australia, New Zealand

 Allothyrus van der Hammen, 1961
 Allothyrus australasiae (Womersley, 1935)
 Allothyrus constrictus (Domrow, 1955)

 Australothyrus van der Hammen, 1983
 Australothyrus ocellatus van der Hammen, 1983

Holothyridae
Holothyridae Thorell, 1882 Sri Lanka, Indian Ocean islands, New Guinea, New Caledonia

 Sternothyrus Lehtinen, 1995
 Sternothyrus braueri (Thon, 1905) — Seychelles

 Lindothyrus Lehtinen, 1995
 Lindothyrus elongatus Lehtinen, 1995 — Lord Howe Island
 Lindothyrus rubellus Lehtinen, 1995 — New Caledonia

 Indothyrus Lehtinen, 1995
 Indothyrus greeni Lehtinen, 1995 — Sri Lanka

 Haplothyrus Lehtinen, 1995
Haplothyrus expolitissimus (Berlese, 1924) — New Caledonia
 Haplothyrus hyatti Lehtinen, 1995 — unknown locality

 Holothyrus Gervais, 1842 — Mauritius
 Holothyrus coccinella Gervais, 1842
 Holothyrus legendrei Hammen, 1983

 Hammenius Lehtinen, 1981
 Hammenius armatus (Canestrini, 1897) — Tamara Island (Aitape): New Guinea
 Hammenius berlesei (Lehtinen, 1995) — New Guinea
 Hammenius braueri (Thon, 1906)
 Hammenius fujuge Lehtinen, 1981 — New Guinea (Central District, Oro Province)
 Hammenius grandjeani (Hammen, 1961) — Mount Bosavi: New Guinea
 Hammenius holthuisi van der Hammen, 1983
 Hammenius ingii Lehtinen, 1981 — New Guinea
 Hammenius insularis Lehtinen, 1995 — Louisiade Archipelago: New Guinea
 Hammenius longipes (Thorell, 1882) — Fly River, New Guinea (?)
 Hammenius mendi (Lehtinen, 1995) — Strickland River: New Guinea
 Hammenius montanus Hammen, 1983 — Irian Jaya
 Hammenius niger (Thon, 1906)

Neothyridae
Neothyridae Lehtinen, 1981  Northern South America and the Caribbean

 Diplothyrus Lehtinen, 1999 Brazil, French Guiana
 Diplothyrus schubarti Lehtinen, 1999
 Diplothyrus lecorrei Klompen 2010
 Diplothyrus lehtineni Vázquez & de Araújo & Feres 2016
 Neothyrus Lehtinen, 1981 Peru
 Neothyrus ana Lehtinen, 1981
Caribothyrus Kontschán & Mahunka 2004 Dominican Republic
Caribothyrus barbatus Kontschán & Mahunka 2004

Footnotes

References
Joel Hallan's Biology Catalog: Holothyrida
 Bruce Halliday: Order Holothyrida
Lehtinen, Pekka T. (1995): Revision of the old world Holothyridae (Arachnida : Anactinotrichida : Holothyrina). Invertebrate Taxonomy 9(4): 767-826. 
Walter, D. E. & Proctor, H. C. (1998): Feeding behaviour and phylogeny: observations on early derivative Acari. Exp. Appl. Acarol 22: 39-50.
Dobson, S. J. & Barker, S. C. (1999): Phylogeny of the hard ticks (Ixodidae) inferred from 18S rRNA indicates that the genus Aponomma is paraphyletic. Mol. Phylogenet. Evol 11: 288-295 

Parasitiformes
Arachnid orders